The CJ-100, also known as DF-100, is a Chinese Strategic long range land-attack hypersonic cruise missile. The missile system is reportedly capable of engaging land-based facilities, reinforced targets, underground bunkers and moving warships. The missile can be mounted on a 10x10 transporter erector launcher (TEL) vehicle in pair of two, or possibly launched by the H-6K bomber. US Air Force's China Aerospace Studies Institute identified and determined CJ-100 is in the People's Liberation Army service as of 2019, and full operational capability (FOC) of the missile system can be achieved by 2022.

Operators

People's Liberation Army Rocket Force

See also
CJ-10
YJ-12

References 

Cruise missiles
Weapons of the People's Republic of China
Nuclear cruise missiles of the People's Republic of China